The 2016–17 season was Falkirk’s fourth season in the Scottish Championship and their sixth consecutive season in the second-tier of Scottish football following their relegation from the Scottish Premier League at the end of the 2009–10 season . Falkirk also competed in the Challenge Cup, League Cup and the Scottish Cup.

Summary

Season
Falkirk finished as runners-up in the Scottish Championship for the second consecutive season and qualified for the Premiership play-offs, losing to Dundee United in the semi-final.

Results and fixtures

Scottish Championship

Premiership play-off

Scottish League Cup

Group stage
Results

Group G Table

Scottish Challenge Cup

Scottish Cup

Player statistics

|-
|colspan="12"|Players who left the club during the 2016–17 season
|-

|}

Club statistics

League table

Division summary

Transfers

Players in

Players out

See also
List of Falkirk F.C. seasons

References

Falkirk
Falkirk F.C. seasons